The women's road race cycling events at the 2020 Summer Paralympics took place from September 1 to 3 at Fuji Speedway, Oyama. Six events took place over twelve classifications.

Classification
Cyclists are given a classification depending on the type and extent of their disability. The classification system allows cyclists to compete against others with a similar level of function. The class number indicates the severity of impairment with "1" being most impaired.

Cycling classes are:
B: Blind and visually impaired cyclists use a Tandem bicycle with a sighted pilot on the front
H 1–4: Cyclists with an impairment that affects their legs use a handcycle
T 1–2: Cyclists with an impairment that affects their balance use a tricycle
C 1-5: Cyclists with an impairment that affects their legs, arms, and/or trunk but are capable of using a standard bicycle

Schedule

Medal table

Medal summary

References

Men's road race